Reta Trotman (born 10 March 1989) is a New Zealand racing cyclist. She competed in the 2013 UCI women's road race in Florence.

Career highlights
2011
 1st in Le Race (NZL)

2012
 1st in Le Race (NZL)

2014
 1st in Le Race (NZL)

References

External links
 

1989 births
Living people
New Zealand female cyclists
Sportspeople from Erfurt
Cyclists at the 2014 Commonwealth Games
Commonwealth Games competitors for New Zealand
21st-century New Zealand women